Mark Goudie (born 1991 ) is a Scottish electrical engineer based in Glasgow. He worked as an engineer for Atkins and currently works as the Distribution System Operation Manager for SP Energy Networks, part of ScottishPower. He was elected as one of the youngest ever Fellows of the Institution of Engineering and Technology. He is a passionate supporter of Science Technology Engineering and Mathematics initiatives in the UK. This is highlighted through his positions as a Trustee of the Glasgow Science Centre, VisitScotland Young Legend for the Energy Sector and as the Chair of the IET Engineering Horizons bursary

Early life and education 
Mark grew up in East Kilbride and studied an MEng in Electrical & Mechanical Engineering at the University of Strathclyde. During his time at university he was a sponsored student with Atkins through the IET Power Academy programme and completed a number of summer placements across the UK.

Career 
Mark joined the Atkins graduate scheme in 2015. In 2015, Mark was also recognised for designing the innovative Wind Energy Reservoir Storage (WERS) system that would seek to repurpose aging oil & gas infrastructure.  In 2020, he became a Chartered Engineer and Fellow with the Institution of Engineering and Technology. He subsequently became the Distribution System Operation Manager for SP Energy Networks.

Awards 
 2015: Telegraph UK STEM Awards - Energy Category Winner 2015
 2017: IET Paul Fletcher Award
 2018: Finalist – Scottish Renewables Young Professionals Green Energy Awards
 2019: Young Legend - Energy Sector
 2020: Elected one of the youngest Fellows of the Institution of Engineering and Technology

References 

British electrical engineers

1991 births
Living people
Alumni of the University of Strathclyde
electrical engineers
Scottish engineers
Scottish electrical engineers
21st-century British engineers
Fellows of the Institution of Engineering and Technology